The parti-coloured bat or rearmouse (Vespertilio murinus) is a species of vesper bat that lives in temperate Eurasia, from Western and Southern Europe, eastwards over the Caucasus and Iran into Mongolia, north-east China, Korea, Afghanistan and northern Pakistan.

Description 
Their twittering call, similar to a bird's call, can be heard particularly in the autumn during the mating season. Its name is derived from its fur, which has two colours. Its back (dorsal side) is red to dark-brown, with silver-white-frosted hair. The ventral side is white or grey. The ears, wings and face are black or dark brown. The wings are narrow. The ears are short, broad and roundish. It is known to live up to 12 years.

Behaviour 
These bats hunt for their prey, for example mosquitoes, caddis flies and moths, with a wide range of ultrasonic sounds, but especially around 25–27 kHz. In cold weather, the bat may remain in its resting place.

There is not much known about the behaviour of parti-coloured bats, as they are quite rare. Female bats live in small groups, of about 50 animals, sometimes up to several hundred adult females. In Western Europe, male groups consist of about 250 animals and are found only during the spring and early summer.

Between October and March, the bats hibernate.

Reproduction and birth 
Females form maternity roosts during May and July and generally give birth to twins. After the pups are weaned, which takes less than six weeks, females leave the maternity roost. Birth of the young is in western Europe around beginning of June.

Distribution
The parti-coloured bat occurs in Central and Western Europe and in Asia. Its natural habitat is mountains, steppes and forested areas, but in Western Europe, they can mainly be found in cities. The species is protected, as it is threatened by insecticides and changes in their habitat.

References 

Vespertilio
Bats of Asia
Bats of Europe
Mammals of Russia
Mammals of Central Asia
Mammals of Turkey
Mammals of Azerbaijan
Bat, Parti-coloured
Mammals of Afghanistan
Mammals of Pakistan
Mammals described in 1758
Taxa named by Carl Linnaeus